Proposition 29 is a California ballot proposition that appeared on the general election on November 8, 2022 that would require staffing, reporting, ownership disclosure, and closing requirements including:

 requiring clinics to have at least one physician, nurse practitioner, or physician assistant – with at least six months of experience with end-stage renal disease care – onsite during patient treatments;

 requiring clinics to report dialysis-related infections to the California Department of Public Health (CDPH);

 requiring clinics to provide patients with a list of physicians with an ownership interest of 5% or more in the clinic;

 requiring clinics to provide the CDPH with a list of persons with ownership interest of 5% or more in the clinic; and

 requiring clinics to obtain the CDPH's written consent before closing or substantially reducing services to patients.

Background

Contents 
The proposition appeared on the ballot as follows:

Support and opposition 
SEIU-UHW West supports proposition 29.

Polling

Results

See also

References

External links

Campaign 

 Yes on 29
 No on Prop 29 – Stop Yet Another Dangerous Dialysis

Ballotpedia 

 California Proposition 29, Dialysis Clinic Requirements Initiative (2022)

Voter Guide 

 KQED California Voter Guide entry

2022 California ballot propositions
Gavin Newsom
Amendments to the Constitution of California
November 2022 events in the United States